Cornriggs Meadows  is a Site of Special Scientific Interest in Upper Weardale in north-west County Durham, England. It consists of a group of fields, located in the Wear valley, 1 km north-west of the village of Cowshill. Most of the fields are maintained as hay meadows by traditional farming methods.

Among a varied grassland flora, one field contains a large colony of a rare lady's mantle, Alchemilla acutiloba , which is endemic to Weardale and Teesdale.

References

Sites of Special Scientific Interest in County Durham
Meadows in County Durham
Stanhope, County Durham